San Diego Zest FC is an American soccer team in San Diego, California, United States. The club was founded in 2016 and is owned and operated by San Diego Sports Authority, a Japanese-owned sports management company. They compete as LA Galaxy SD Zest in USL League Two and play their home matches at James Madison High School's George Hoagland Stadium. The team colors are Orange and Navy.

History  
The San Diego Zest FC was established in 2016 by a sports management company called San Diego Sports Authority, hereafter SDSA, located at San Diego, CA. The project was started in 2014 with aim of developing the local community soccer level and providing Japanese soccer players the path to pro in the U.S.  On January 21, 2016, the USL PDL announced that it had awarded the franchise to San Diego Zest FC, starting with the 2016 season. "San Diego has for a long time been a target city for the USL PDL, we are very excited the outstanding leadership of the San Diego Sports Authority will be the group that brings the league to a great soccer city, and are looking forward to working with the club for many years to come.” said league director Todd Eason.

2016: Inaugural Season 
 San Diego Zest FC had a very successful inaugural season campaign. They finished with an 8-1-5 record, which resulted in a 2nd-place finish in the Southwestern Division and clinching a berth into the USL PDL playoffs. They lost in a very close match to FC Golden State Force 2–3 in overtime.

 Zest FC was led by its two stars, UCLA's DF/MF Erik Holt, and Chico State's FW Matthew Hurlow-Paonessa. Holt was named to PDL's All-Western Conference team, scoring 2 goals and playing very well in the playoffs. Hurlow-Paonessa was a scoring phenomenon for Zest FC, scoring 9 goals and contributing an assist during his campaign.
 Hurlow-Paonessa became the first player to sign with a professional soccer club in San Diego Zest FC's history, agreeing to his first professional contract with Phoenix Rising FC.

2017: Second Season 
 On February 22, 2017, San Diego Zest FC officially clinched a berth for the 2017 Lamar Hunt U.S. Open Cup as a result from their very successful inaugural season. They lost to LA Wolves FC in the opening round 2-4 in their U.S. Open Cup debut. Zest FC was not able to carry its high performance from its inaugural season, finishing with a 3-9-2 record in its 2nd season.

Introduced Women's Team To Compete in 2018 

 On May 22, 2017, San Diego Zest FC announced the founding of an all woman's team to compete in the Women's Premier Soccer League, WPSL, starting in the 2018 season. The sister club of the San Diego Zest will hope to emulate the same success their founding team who are competing in their second season as members of the USL PDL.

New Ownership of Montenegrin Third Division Club FK Adria 

 On October 4, San Diego Zest FC announced its new ownership of Montenegro soccer club, FK Adria, launched and started competing in the Montenegrin Third League in the 2017–2018 season. FK Adria, named after the Adriatic Sea, has a mission to groom people to be successful individuals, even after their playing careers have ended, at the international level by implementing a vision that includes what the team calls "character-building through soccer.

Partnership with Los Angeles Galaxy San Diego 

 San Diego Zest FC announced a new partnership with Los Angeles Galaxy San Diego on November 17th. Zest FC and LA Galaxy San Diego are committed to benefiting each other through cooperation and developing good sportsmanship within the athletes while promoting enthusiasm within the community locally, nationally, and internationally through soccer.

U.S. Pro Soccer Combine in Japan 

 San Diego Zest FC hosted a 2-Day U.S. Pro Soccer Combine on December 16th and 17th in Fukuoka, Japan. Four clubs from USL Championship including Charleston Battery, Richmond Kickers, North Carolina FC and Nashville SC. attended for scouting Asian talents. Several players from the combine were invited to each club's second tryout.

2018: Third Season

Zest FC Women Announces New Affiliation with Japan's First Division Club AC Nagano Parceiro Ladies 

 San Diego Zest FC has announced that its women’s team, San Diego Zest FC Women, which will be competing its inaugural season in Women’s Premier Soccer League this summer, has affiliated with Japanese club AC Nagano Parceiro Ladies, which currently competes in Japan’s women’s first division. AC Nagano Parceiro Ladies was established in 2000. The team is owned by AC Nagano Parceiro, which competes in Japan’s Men’s third division, J3 League. Former Parceiro Ladies player, Kumi Yokohama, has been selected for Japan’s national team squad since 2015 and currently plays for FFC Frankfurt, which competes in the first division of Women’s Bundesliga.

Year-by-year

Head coaches 
  Cem Tont (2016–2017) 
  Jaewoo Kim (2018–present)

Coaching Staff

Players

Notable former players 

This list of notable former players comprises players who went on to play professional soccer after playing for the team in the Premier Development League, or those who previously played professionally before joining the team.

  Matthew Hurlow-Paonessa (2016, Chico State Wildcats to Phoenix Rising FC)
  Brian Iloski (2016, UCLA Bruins to Legia Warsaw)
  Erik Holt (2016, UCLA Bruins to Real Salt Lake)
  Justin Fiddes (2016, Washington Huskies to Vancouver Whitecaps FC)
  Don Tchilao (2017, Oregon State Beavers to LA Galaxy II)
  Abdoulaye Cissoko (2019, Tacoma Defiance to Seattle Sounders FC)

Average Attendance 
 2016: 365
 2017: 293
 2018: 121
 2019: TBD

External links 
 San Diego Zest FC Official Website

References 

USL League Two teams
Association football clubs established in 2016
Zest
2016 establishments in California